The Prussian G 1 was a class of 0-4-0 goods locomotive of the Prussian States Railways.  The original design came from the Prussian Eastern Railway.  The long branch lines required tender locomotives, as tank locomotives could not carry sufficient coal and water.  A total of 44 locomotives of this type were delivered to the Prussian Eastern Railway in 1878 and 1879.

After the establishment of the Prussian State Railways, a need for more locomotives of this type was identified. Therefore, between 1887 and 1898, another 49 locomotives of this type were ordered. In 1905, these locomotives received the classification G 1, and were renumbered into the 3001–3050 number block. The differences between the two delivery series were minor.

The Deutsche Reichsbahn did not include any of these locomotives in their renumbering plan; the last of the type was retired in the early 1920s.

The locomotives were couples to type 2 T 8 tenders.

Notes

References

0-4-0 locomotives
G 01
Railway locomotives introduced in 1878
Standard gauge locomotives of Germany
B n2 locomotives
Freight locomotives
Berliner locomotives
Hanomag locomotives
Hohenzollern locomotives
Schichau-Werke locomotives
Borsig locomotives
Henschel locomotives
Wöhlert locomotives